Victor Brown may refer to:

Victor Brown (EastEnders), fictional character from EastEnders
Vic Brown (footballer) (1903–1971), English footballer
Victor L. Brown (1914–1996), Canadian leader in The Church of Jesus Christ of Latter-day Saints
Victor Upton-Brown (1880–1964), Australian rules football coach
Victor Brown (musician) (?–2016), Cuban-born, Jamaican-British variety performer
Victor Brown (footballer) (born 1984), Nigerian footballer